Wiener Neustadt West Airport  is a military airport located  south-southwest of Wien, Austria.

See also
List of airports in Austria

References

External links 
 Airport record for Wiener Neustadt West Airport at Landings.com
 

Airports in Lower Austria